PDN PhotoPlus International Conference + Expo ("PhotoPlus") is an annual event held at the Jacob K. Javits Convention Center in New York. Designed for professional and advanced amateur photographers, Photoplus displays recent advances in photography through a variety of exhibitions as well as photography and digital design seminars.

In 2022, the company rebranded as CreateNYC and moved to the Duggal Greenhouse in Brooklyn.

Exhibits 
The event includes exhibits on photography, design, and digital imaging. The subject matter varies considerably, ranging from color management to retouching and storage. The 2007 event included over 300 exhibitors and over 10,000 items on display.  Exhibitors have included Adobe Systems, Apple, Canon, Epson, FujiFilm, Microsoft, Nikon, Olympus Corporation, and Sony.  Confirmed exhibitors for 2008 included the aforementioned Adobe Systems, Canon, Casio, Epson, Nikon, Olympus and Sony, as well as American Express, Carl Zeiss, Fujifilm USA, Hasselblad, Leica Camera, Mitsubishi Digital Electronics, and Xerox.

Workshops and keynote addresses 
Over 100 photography seminars are held.  These include hands-on workshops and keynotes by reputable photographers, with a focus on recent innovations in digital imaging techniques.

References

External links 

Photography exhibitions